The Orikaka River (also known as the Mackley River) is a river of the West Coast Region of New Zealand's South Island. It flows southwest from the southern end of the Matiri Range before turning south to flow into the Buller River five kilometres to the west of Inangahua.

See also
List of rivers of New Zealand

References

Rivers of the West Coast, New Zealand
Buller District
Rivers of New Zealand